Tesch is a surname. Notable people with the surname include:

Al Tesch (1891–1947), American baseball player
Bruno Tesch (1890–1946), German chemist
Cornelia Tesch, German figure skater 
Johanna Tesch (1875–1945), German politician
Liesl Tesch (born 17 May 1969), Australian Paralympic wheelchair basketball player and politician
Maria Tesch (1850–1936), Swedish photographer 
Silke Tesch (born 1958), German politician
Willy Tesch, Swedish sprint canoer